Hou Debang (9 August 1890 – 26 August 1974), also known as Hou Qirong and Hou Te-Pang, was a Chinese chemist and chemical engineer. He was born in Taijiang District of Fuzhou (then known as Houguan County). Graduating from Tsinghua Preparatory School in 1912, Hou was one of the scholars sent to the United States to study modern technologies. He obtained his master's degree in chemical engineering at Massachusetts Institute of Technology (1917), and later obtained his doctoral degree at Columbia University (1921).

From 1950, Hou Debang served as a consultant in the chemical industry bureau of the Ministry of Heavy Industry. In 1957 he joined the Chinese Communist Party and in 1959 was appointed deputy minister of the Ministry of Chemical Industry. Among Hou's discoveries was his 1933 improvement to the Solvay process for producing sodium carbonate.

On August 26, 1974, already ill from leukemia, he suffered a cerebral hemorrhage and died.

References

1890 births
1974 deaths
Chemists from Zhejiang
Chinese chemical engineers
Columbia University alumni
Chinese Communist Party politicians from Fujian
Engineers from Fujian
MIT School of Engineering alumni
Members of Academia Sinica
Members of the Chinese Academy of Sciences
People's Republic of China politicians from Fujian
Politicians from Fuzhou
Scientists from Fujian